The 2023 Open Championship, officially the 151st Open Championship, is a golf tournament to be played on 16–23 July 2023 at Royal Liverpool Golf Club near Hoylake, Merseyside, England. This will be the 13th time that The Open will be played at Royal Liverpool

Organisation
The Open Championship is organised by the R&A, and is included in the PGA Tour, European Tour, and Japan Golf Tour calendars under the major championships category. The tournament is a 72-hole (4 rounds) stroke play competition held over 4 days, with 18 holes played each day. Play is in groups of three for the first two days, and groups of two in the final two days. Groupings for the first two days are decided by the organisers, with each group having one morning, and one afternoon tee time. On the final two days, players tee off in reverse order of aggregate score, with the leaders last. After 36 holes there was a cut, after which the top 70 and ties progress through to compete in the third and fourth rounds. In the event of a tie for the lowest score after four rounds, a four-hole aggregate playoff will be held to determine the winner; this will be followed by sudden-death extra holes if necessary until a winner emerges.

Venue

The 2023 event will be the 13th Open Championship played at Royal Liverpool. The most recent was in 2015, when Rory McIlroy won the event by two strokes for his fourth major title.

Field
The Open Championship field is made up of 156 players, who gained entry through various exemption criteria and qualifying tournaments. The criteria included past Open champions, recent major winners, top ranked players in the world rankings and from the leading world tours, and winners and high finishers from various designated tournaments, including the Open Qualifying Series; the winners of designated amateur events, including The Amateur Championship and U.S. Amateur, also gained exemption provided they remain an amateur. Anyone not qualifying via exemption, and had a handicap of 0.4 or lower, can gain entry through regional and final qualifying events.

Most exemption criteria remained unchanged from previous years; changes included the removal of exemptions for recent Ryder Cup and Presidents Cup players, and a new exemption for amateur golfers.

Criteria and exemptions
Each player is classified according to the first category in which he qualified, but other categories are shown in parentheses.

1. The Open Champions aged 60 or under on 23 July 2023

Stewart Cink
Darren Clarke (20)
Ben Curtis
John Daly
David Duval
Ernie Els (2)
Todd Hamilton
Pádraig Harrington
Zach Johnson (2)
Paul Lawrie
Justin Leonard
Shane Lowry (2,5,6)
Rory McIlroy (2,3,5,12)
Phil Mickelson (2,10)
Francesco Molinari (2)
Collin Morikawa (2,10,12)
Louis Oosthuizen
Cameron Smith (2,3,11,12)
Jordan Spieth (2,3,12)
Henrik Stenson (2)
Tiger Woods (9)

2. The Open Champions for 2012–2022

3. Top 10 finishers and ties in the 2022 Open Championship

Patrick Cantlay (12)
Bryson DeChambeau (8)
Tommy Fleetwood (5)
Brian Harman (12)
Viktor Hovland (5,12)
Dustin Johnson (9)
Cameron Young (12)

4. Top 50 players in the Official World Golf Ranking (OWGR) for Week 21, 2023

29 May

5. Top 30 in the final 2022 DP World Tour Rankings

Adri Arnaus
Richard Bland
Ewen Ferguson
Matt Fitzpatrick (8,12)
Ryan Fox
Tyrrell Hatton (6)
Rasmus Højgaard
Pablo Larrazábal
Thriston Lawrence
Hurly Long
Robert MacIntyre
Adrian Meronk
Guido Migliozzi
Alex Norén
Thorbjørn Olesen
Adrián Otaegui
Yannik Paul
Victor Perez
Thomas Pieters
Jon Rahm (8,12)
Richie Ramsay
Shubhankar Sharma
Callum Shinkwin
Jordan Smith
Connor Syme
Will Zalatoris (12)

6. Recent winners of the BMW PGA Championship (2019–2022)

Billy Horschel (12)
Danny Willett

7. Top five players, not already exempt, within the top 20 of the 2023 Race to Dubai Rankings through the BMW International Open

25 June

8. Recent winners of the U.S. Open (2018–2023)

Brooks Koepka (10)
Gary Woodland
18 June

9. Recent winners of the Masters Tournament (2018–2023)

Patrick Reed
Hideki Matsuyama (12)
Scottie Scheffler (11,12)
9 April

10. Recent winners of the PGA Championship (2017–2023)

Justin Thomas (11,12)
21 May

11. Recent winners of The Players Championship (2021–2023)

12. The top 30 players from the 2022 FedEx Cup Playoffs

Sam Burns
Corey Conners
Tony Finau
Talor Gooch
Tom Hoge
Max Homa
Im Sung-jae
Lee Kyoung-hoon
Joaquín Niemann
J. T. Poston
Xander Schauffele
Adam Scott
Scott Stallings
Sepp Straka
Sahith Theegala

13. Top five players, not already exempt, within the top 20 of the 2022–23 FedEx Cup points list through the Travelers Championship

25 June

14. Winner of the 2022 Visa Open de Argentina

Zack Fischer

15. Winner of the 2022–23 PGA Tour of Australasia Order of Merit

David Micheluzzi

16. Winner of the 2022–23 Sunshine Tour Order of Merit

23 April

17. Winner of the 2022 Japan Open Golf Championship

Taiga Semikawa (a)

18. Top two players on the 2022 Japan Golf Tour Official Money List

Kazuki Higa
Rikuya Hoshino

19. The top player on the 2023 Japan Golf Tour Official Money List through the Japan Golf Tour Championship

4 June

20. Winner of the 2022 Senior Open Championship

Darren Clarke

21. Winner of the 2023 Amateur Championship

24 June

22. Winner of the 2022 U.S. Amateur

Sam Bennett (a)

23. Winner of the 2023 European Amateur

1 July

24. Recipient of the 2022 Mark H. McCormack Medal

Keita Nakajima

25. Winner of the 2021 Asia-Pacific Amateur Championship

Harrison Crowe (a)

26. Winner of the 2023 Latin America Amateur Championship

Mateo Fernández de Oliveira (a)

27. Winner of the 2023 Open Amateur Series

1 July

Open Qualifying Series
The Open Qualifying Series (OQS) for the 2023 Open Championship consists of 11 events. Places are available to the leading players (not otherwise exempt) who make the cut. In the event of ties, positions go to players ranked highest according to that week's OWGR. Unlike in previous years, if a player who has qualified through OQS becomes exempt through other criteria before 1 June, the next highest non-exempt finisher from that OQS event will become exempt.

Final Qualifying
Regional qualifying events will be held on 26 June at 14 locations. Final Qualifying events will be played on 4 July at four locations.

Notes

References

External links

The Open Championship
Golf tournaments in England
Sport in the Metropolitan Borough of Wirral
Open Championship
Open Championship
Open Championship